Bronson is a town in Levy County, Florida, United States. The population was 1,113 at the 2010 census. It is the county seat of Levy County.

Geography

Bronson is located at  (29.448784, –82.636314).

Demographics

As of the census of 2000, there were 964 people, 370 households, and 256 families residing in the town. The racial makeup of the town was 66.39% White, 29.15% African American, 1.45% Native American, 0.10% Asian, 2.07% from other races, and 0.83% from two or more races. Hispanic or Latino of any race were 8.09% of the population.

There were 370 households, out of which 34.9% had children under the age of 18 living with them, 42.7% were married couples living together, 22.4% had a female householder with no husband present, and 30.8% were non-families. 25.7% of all households were made up of individuals, and 11.4% had someone living alone who was 65 years of age or older.  The average household size was 2.61 and the average family size was 3.16.

In the town, the population was spread out, with 29.1% under the age of 18, 12.0% from 18 to 24, 24.3% from 25 to 44, 22.6% from 45 to 64, and 11.9% who were 65 years of age or older.  The median age was 32 years. For every 100 females, there were 81.9 males.  For every 100 females age 18 and over, there were 76.5 males.

The median income for a household in the town was $26,944, and the median income for a family was $28,462. Males had a median income of $27,969 versus $20,385 for females. The per capita income for the town was $12,532.  About 21.9% of families and 27.2% of the population were below the poverty line, including 36.5% of those under age 18 and 21.4% of those age 65 or over.

Education
School Board of Levy County operates public schools. Bronson has two public schools: Bronson Middle/High School and Bronson Elementary. The School Board of Levy County controls their operation and also supervises two charter schools: Nature Coast Middle School and Whispering Winds. Other schools under the board's jurisdiction are in the city of Chiefland, the city of Williston, the city of Cedar Key, and the town of Yankeetown.

Library
Levy County provides Bronson with a local library branch. The Bronson Public Library was built by the Felburn Foundation founder; J. Phil Felburn. The Levy County Public Library System is a member of PAL (Putnam, Alachua and Levy County Public Library Cooperative).

References

County seats in Florida
Towns in Levy County, Florida
Towns in Florida